Negin Dadkhah (born 23 November 1990) is an Iranian national speed skater.

Background

Competitions

Negin is currently training with The Powerslide Team in Iran.

References

External links
https://www.facebook.com/#!/pages/Negin-Dadkhah/248165511867520?sk=info

1990 births
Living people
Place of birth missing (living people)